Akira Nakashima (中嶋 章 or 中島 章, also written as Nakashima Akira, Nakasima Akira or Nakajima Akira, 5 January 1908 – 29 October 1970) was a Japanese electrical engineer of the NEC.

He got a bachelor's degree in electrical engineering from the Imperial University of Tokyo.

Nakashima introduced switching circuit theory in papers from 1934 to 1936, laying the foundations for digital circuit design, in digital computers and other areas of modern technology. This is considered to be an achievement on a par with Claude Shannon, who presented a similar theory at the same time.

References

1908 births
1970 deaths
20th-century Japanese engineers
NEC people
University of Tokyo alumni